The Mountain Lake Colony House (also known as the Mountain Lake Club House) is a historic site within the Mountain Lake Estates Historic District in Lake Wales, Florida. This three-story Mediterranean Revival clubhouse and inn was originally designed in 1916 by Frederick Law Olmsted, Jr., and features pergolas, loggias, and a barrel-tile roof. It is located east of State Road 17, on the north shore of Mountain Lake. On February 22, 1991, it was added to the U.S. National Register of Historic Places.

References

External links
 Polk County listings at National Register of Historic Places
 Polk County listings at Florida's Office of Cultural and Historical Programs
 Colony House Photos and History from Mountain Lake, Florida

Buildings and structures in Lake Wales, Florida
National Register of Historic Places in Polk County, Florida
1916 establishments in Florida
Buildings and structures completed in 1916